Esme Steyn (born 22 March 1953) is a South African international lawn bowler.

Bowls career
In 2005 she won the pairs gold medal at the Atlantic Bowls Championships.

She competed in the women's fours and the women's triples events at the 2014 Commonwealth Games where she won a gold and bronze medal respectively.

She was selected as part of the South Africa team for the 2018 Commonwealth Games on the Gold Coast in Queensland.

She won the 2011 & 2012 singles at the National Championships bowling for the Linden Bowls Club.

References

1953 births
Living people
Bowls players at the 2014 Commonwealth Games
Commonwealth Games gold medallists for South Africa
Commonwealth Games bronze medallists for South Africa
South African female bowls players
Sportspeople from Durban
Commonwealth Games medallists in lawn bowls
Medallists at the 2014 Commonwealth Games